Hysen Bajram Osmanaj (born 3 October 1957) is member of the Central Election Commission of Albania for the Democratic Party of Albania.

References

Living people
1957 births
Politicians from Tirana
Democratic Party of Albania politicians
21st-century Albanian politicians